Christian Democracy (Democrazia Cristiana, DC) is a minor Christian democratic political party in Italy.

History
The sentence of the United Sections of the Court of Cassation n. 25999/2010 definitively sanctioned that the historical Christian Democracy did not have a juridical continuity with the various formations that had claimed the succession of that party. The ruling also made it clear that Christian Democracy was never dissolved by Congress, the only statutory body entitled to take such a decision. Therefore, on the initiative of Clelio Darida, with a notice in the Official Gazette of March 12, 2012, the National Council in charge in 1993 was reconvened to deliberate the election of the Political Secretary and the President. The council, meeting in Rome on March 30, 2012, elected Gianni Fontana as Political Secretary, Silvio Lega as President of the National Council and Clelio Darida as Honorary President. Therefore, the political subjects who claimed the name "Christian Democracy" became three, led respectively by Giuseppe Pizza, Angelo Sandri and Gianni Fontana. Even the party led by Fontana resumed the celebration of the congresses continuing the numbering from the last of those celebrated by the historical DC, the XVIII held in 1989. Thus, in November 2012 the XIX congress was celebrated, which ratified the election of Fontana as Secretary. Subsequently, however, the members of the reborn DC changed its nature and name to "Christian Democracy Association" and Gianni Fontana took on the role of president of the association.

In May 2012 Giampiero Catone, a deputy elected with The People of Freedom and formerly a leading member of the Christian Democratic Centre, the Union of Christian and Centre Democrats and Christian Democracy for the Autonomies, joined the party, which was thus given parliamentary representation.

On December 19, 2018 Gianfranco Rotondi, president of the Federation of Christian Democracy, Mario Tassone, secretary of the New CDU, Giorgio Merlo, leader of "White Network" and Renato Grassi, secretary of the DC, signed a federative pact for the reconstitution of the Christian Democracy, that, on June 8, 2019, became a foundation.

On the occasion of the general elections of 2022, the DC joins the "Third Pole", that is the joint list of Action and Italia Viva promoted by Carlo Calenda and Matteo Renzi.

Leadership
Secretary: Gianni Fontana (2012–2018); Renato Grassi (2018–present)
President: Silvio Lega (2012–2018); Gianni Fontana (2018–2019); Renzo Gubert (2019–present)
Honorary President: Clelio Darida (2012–2017)

References

External links
Official website

2012 establishments in Italy
Christian democratic parties in Italy
Catholic political parties
Political parties established in 2012